Martin A. Allen (1931–2009) was the chairman,  co-founder, president, and largest individual stockholder (2,272,866 shares) of Computervision Corp. Its first product, CADDS-1, was aimed at the printed circuit layout, and 2-D drafting markets.

Career

Computervision Corp. 
Martin (Marty) A. Allen co-founded Computervision Corp. in 1969 with Philippe Villers in Boston, MA. In 1980 he lead an effort to create the first Graphics Processing Unit (GPU), build to handle 2-D and 3-D modeling.

Retirement 
Allen netted $34 million when, at age 57, he sold Computervision Corp. to Prime Computer Inc. on 29 January 1988.

Early life and education 
Born in Des Moines, Iowa, Allen was raised in California. He attended the University of California, Berkeley and obtained the degree in engineering.

References

1931 births
2009 deaths
20th-century American businesspeople
American computer businesspeople